Kristina Mundt (later Richter, born 25 January 1966) is a German rower.

Mundt was born in Merseburg. In October 1986, she was awarded a Patriotic Order of Merit in gold (first class) for her sporting success.

References

External links
 
 

1966 births
Living people
East German female rowers
German female rowers
People from Merseburg
Rowers at the 1988 Summer Olympics
Rowers at the 1992 Summer Olympics
Olympic gold medalists for East Germany
Olympic gold medalists for Germany
Olympic rowers of East Germany
Olympic rowers of Germany
Olympic medalists in rowing
World Rowing Championships medalists for East Germany
Medalists at the 1992 Summer Olympics
Medalists at the 1988 Summer Olympics
World Rowing Championships medalists for Germany
Recipients of the Patriotic Order of Merit in gold
Sportspeople from Saxony-Anhalt